Paramount Evil was the fourth studio album by Impiety released on October 18, 2004. Pete Helkamp of Angelcorpse contributed vocals on the track Carbonized. Four pressing formats of the album were available; regular jewel case, digipak edition with a cover of Sepultura’s Morbid Visions and sticker that was limited to 2000 copies, regular vinyl to 500 copies and 100 on picture disc. The album was licensed to Paragon Records for release in North America without the song Morbid Visions. The artwork for digipak version was painted by Erik Danielsson of Swedish black metal band Watain.

Track listing

Personnel
Shyaithan – vocals, bass
Antimo Buonanno – guitar
Eduardo Guevara – guitar
Oscar Garcia – drums

Additional personnel
Christophe Szpajdel – logo

Impiety (band) albums
2004 albums